Vierzon FC is a French association football club founded in 2001 as Vierzon Foot 18, the result of a merger between FC Vierzon and Stade Vierzonnais. In 2015 they merged with Églantine Vierzon and assumed their current name. They are based in the town of Vierzon and their home stadium is the Stade de Labras. As of the 2017–18 season, the club plays in Championnat National 3, the fifth tier of French football.

Current squad

References

External links
  

Football clubs in France
Association football clubs established in 2001
2001 establishments in France
Sport in Cher (department)
Football clubs in Centre-Val de Loire